is a novel by Japanese author Yusuke Kishi published in 1999.

Plot summary 
The main protagonist, Fujiki awakens to find himself in a strange desert landscape suffering from amnesia. His only clue is a small generic hand held game console "Pocket Game Kids," which informs him that he is now the unwilling participant in a game called "The Mars Labyrinth" and must head for the "1st checkpoint." While attempting to recall the foggy circumstances surrounding his arrival in the mysterious landscape he comes upon a woman named Ai. Since her machine is broken they decide to cooperate in order to reach the first checkpoint.

Upon their arrival, they meet seven additional players who also possess the game machines. The game's instructions are divided among all the players to ensure initial cooperation. The nine players discover that there are seven total checkpoints. The second checkpoint is divided into four possible choices: North for information, East for survival items, South for food, and West for self-defense items. The players divide up and agree to reconvene in order to divide up the items. Ai suggests to Fujiki that they choose "North." Upon reaching the checkpoint they are given additional game software which includes survival tips and explains that the game is set in the Bungle Bungles of Australia.

Once the players reunite it becomes apparent that they have all chosen to act selfishly and hold out on each other so Fujiki decides not to share all of their new found information. The following day everyone parts company but Fujiki and Ai decide to remain as a team and focus on honing their survival skills.

It eventually becomes apparent that the initial directions chosen by the players determines their roles in the game.

Fujiki eventually discovers that the entire game is constructed in the manner of a gamebook and that the nefarious purpose of their captors is to pit the players into a bloody contest against each other in order to create an elaborate snuff film from which only one is permitted to emerge alive.

Characters 

The main protagonist is a disillusioned salaryman. He awakes inside the labyrinth suffering from amnesia.

Ai is an erotic manga artist who befriends Fujiki early in the story.

An older gentleman who seems to favor cooperation among the players.

An irritable personality and the only other female among the players besides Ai.

For all his tough talk, he pairs up with Seno acting as his lackey.

A former school teacher.

A temp worker. He partners with Tsurumi.

The largest and strongest member of the group. He teams up with Funaoka, utilizing him as a sidekick.

Naramoto's partner.

References 

1999 Japanese novels
Vertical (publisher) titles